Keyboard Sonata No. 20 (Haydn) may refer to:
Piano Sonata Hob. XVI/18, L. 20, in B-flat major
Piano Sonata Hob. XVI/20, L. 33, in C minor